Dwiggins is a surname. Notable people with the surname include:

Clare Victor Dwiggins (1874–1958), American cartoonist
Sue Dwiggins (1914–2011), American writer and production assistant
William Addison Dwiggins (1880–1956), American type designer, calligrapher, and book designer

See also
Diggins (disambiguation)
Wiggins (surname)